A ponytail is a hairstyle where hair is gathered and secured at the back of the head.

Ponytail or ponytails may also refer to:

Ponytail (band), an American art rock band
The Poni-Tails, a 1950s female American group
"Pony tail", a song by Wild Beasts from the 2016 album Boy King
Ponytail radish, or Chonggak radish, a variety of white radish
Ponytail palm, Beaucarnea recurvata, an evergreen perennial plant
Ponytail Canasta, a variation of the card game Canasta

See also

Pigtail
Ponytail-gate, a minor controversy involving John Key